The 1896 Victorian Football Association season was the 20th season of the Australian rules football competition. It was the final season in which the Association was the highest level of senior football competition in Victoria, with eight of its strongest members leaving the league and establishing the rival Victorian Football League from 1897.

The season was opened on 2 May, and concluded on 3 October with a playoff match for the premiership between the top two teams, in which  defeated  by one goal. It was Collingwood's first VFA premiership.

Premiership season 
In 1896, the VFA competition consisted of thirteen teams of 20 on-the-field players each. Because there was an odd number of teams, at least one team had a bye each week; the idle club often travelled to Ballarat to play one of the local senior clubs in a non-premiership match.

When reporting match scores in 1896, the number of goals and behinds scored by each team is given; however, only the number of goals scored is considered when determining the result of a match. This was the final VFA season before the introduction of the modern system of scoring, in which six points is awarded for a goal and one point is awarded for a behind.

Round 1

Round 2

Round 3

Round 4

Round 5

Round 6

Round 7

Round 8

Round 9

Round 10

Round 11

Round 12

Round 13

Round 14

Round 15

Round 16

Round 17

Round 18

Round 19

Round 20

Ladder 

The Association had no formal tie-breakers in cases where clubs were equal on premiership points.

Playoff match 

 and  finished level on 58 premiership points at the conclusion of the premiership matches, meaning a playoff match for the premiership was required between them.

It is often said that this playoff match was required because, in addition to having equal win–loss records, Collingwood and South Melbourne had finished with an equal record of goals scored and goals conceded and therefore could not be split on a tie-breaker; while this version of events is given in several modern references, contemporary sources reveal this to be a myth. Association Rule 19, which specifically covered the event of a playoff, did not consider goals scored or conceded as a means of tie-breaker for the premiership, and newspaper match previews leading into Round 19 made clear that win–loss record was the only consideration for determining whether or not there would be a playoff. Additionally, the clubs' for-and-against records were not quite identical: Collingwood had scored one goal more than South Melbourne for the season, but the fact that the tallies were so close helped to perpetuate the myth.

It was the second time in VFA history that a playoff match was staged for the premiership, the first having occurred in 1878, but it was the first time that a playoff had been required since the formal introduction of the premiership ladder in 1888: the 1878 playoff was required to resolve a dispute between Melbourne and Geelong.

Scheduling controversy
The fact that a playoff would be required between Collingwood and South Melbourne was known after Round 19: both Collingwood and South Melbourne had a bye in Round 20 with third-placed Essendon six premiership points adrift, leaving them with no chance of tying for or finishing first.

As a result, the two clubs organised to stage their playoff match on Saturday 26 September, the same day as the other Round 20 matches, at the neutral East Melbourne Cricket Ground; arrangements were made and advertisements were published. However, on the Tuesday, delegates from all Association clubs voted 11–8 in favour of postponing the playoff match to Saturday 3 October, the following weekend.

Arguments in favour of postponing the match centred mostly around the fact that a playoff match would detract from interest, attendances and gate takings at the rostered Round 20 matches, while arguments in favour of staging the playoff during Round 20 were to remove the need for the clubs to train for an extra week, and that public desire for the match to be held on 26 September was strong.

A second meeting was held on the Wednesday night after Collingwood and South Melbourne objected to the postponement, but the Association delegates again voted in favour of postponing the match, albeit by a reduced majority of 10–9.

While Collingwood and South Melbourne initially discussed playing the match on 26 September anyway, in spite of the Association's decision, this proved to be unworkable as the Association declined to provide an umpire.

Subsequently, Collingwood arranged to play Bendigo Football League premiers Eaglehawk at Victoria Park during Round 20, winning 6.7 – 3.6, while South Melbourne used the week as a bye.

Match summary
The playoff match itself was played at a high standard in front of 12,000 spectators at the East Melbourne Cricket Ground. Two late goals in the first quarter allowed Collingwood to open up a 4–2 lead at quarter time, but Collingwood went goalless through the second and third quarters as South Melbourne dominated the game and regained the lead at 5–4. Collingwood tied the game early in the final quarter, then kicked the winning goal inside the final ten minutes to win 6–5.

Notable events 
 Following 's 4–3 win against  in Round 5, it was revealed that due to a timekeepers' error the final quarter had lasted 30 minutes instead of the regulation 25 minutes. Because Collingwood had scored the winning goal in these extra five minutes (in fact, on the final bell), Carlton formally challenged to have the result amended to a 3–3 draw. The challenge was dismissed at the Association's next meeting three weeks later. The ultimate importance of this decision on the final placings should not be overlooked as Collingwood tied for first place and Carlton tied for last place on the ladder.
 In its Round 9 match against first placed , last placed  was penalised for having too many men on the field. Richmond was leading Essendon at half time by 3.3 – 2.4, but Essendon called for a head count after half time, which found Richmond had 21 men on the field. Richmond's score was reset to zero, and Essendon went on to win 9.9 – 1.4. Four weeks later against Port Melbourne, Richmond was subjected to another head count at half-time, and the umpire again found Richmond had 21 men on the field, but a recount after the players had gone to the dressing rooms found only twenty, so Richmond was not penalized.
They invaded the field, some with weapons, and players from both teams were forced to protect Roberts from the mob, with Bill Proudfoot, a constable with Victoria Police, escorting him out of the ground. McDougall of North Melbourne was the most badly injured player in the riot, concussed after a blow to the head. The incident added to the already bad reputation of the North Melbourne ground and the "ruffianly element" of its patrons.
The split was the culmination of several years of concerns from the strongest clubs about the standard and competitiveness of the Association. As such, the VFA ceased to serve as the top senior level of football in Victoria after twenty seasons; it has continued operating as a second-tier senior competition since.

Charity Cup 
On the Saturday between Rounds 5 and 6, a Charity Cup event was held, the gate takings from which were donated to charity. Each match was played over two periods of twenty minutes each. The competition was won by Essendon.

The Charity Cup was used to trial two new rules in the VFA:
 The use of boundary umpires, one on each sideline, to conduct boundary throw-ins; at the time, this responsibility fell to the field umpire in the VFA
 The removal of the "little mark", which meant the ball had to be kicked at least ten yards for the umpire to call a mark.
Both of these rule changes were soon adopted into all levels of the game.

References 

Victorian Football League seasons
VFL